Concerned Philosophers For Peace (CPP) is an organization of professional philosophers founded in 1981. It is the "largest and most active organization of professional philosophers in North America oriented to the critique of militarism and the search for a just and lasting peace." The organization sponsors an annual conference, as well as programs at meetings of the American Philosophical Association.

References

 Organization Website
 Facebook Page
 Arun Gandhi to Address Concerned Philosophers for Peace Conference on Campus

Peace organizations based in the United States
Philosophy organizations